Rose Gregorio (born October 17, 1934) is an American actress. She began her career appearing mostly in theatre in Chicago and New York City during the 1950s and 1960s. During the 1970s she became more active in television and film, appearing mostly in supporting roles.

Early years
Gregorio's parents came from Italy. She was born in Chicago in 1934.

Early career
Gregorio began her career appearing onstage in Chicago in the 1950s. She made her television debut in 1961 on Armstrong Circle Theatre in The Fortune Tellers, a new play, starring opposite Val Avery. The following year she moved to New York City, making her Off-Broadway debut as the title character in William Snyder's The Days and Nights of BeeBee Fenstermaker at the Sheridan Square Playhouse, a production which also starred Robert Duvall. She next appeared as Martha in the 1963 play Journey to the Day at the Lucille Lortel Theatre.

During the mid-1960s Gregorio served as a standby performer for many Broadway shows in case the regularly scheduled actress was unable to perform. She finally made her official Broadway debut in 1968 in Jack Gelber's The Cuban Thing at the Henry Miller's Theatre. That same year she landed her first film role, the role of Sylvia Finney in Frank Perry's The Swimmer. The following year she returned to Broadway to appear opposite Dustin Hoffman in Jimmy Shine.

Later career
In the 1970s, her career became more centered on film and television. Her movie appearances include Gloria Soloway in Who Is Harry Kellerman and Why Is He Saying Those Terrible Things About Me? (1971), Ruth in Desperate Characters (1971), Angela in Mr. Ricco (1975), Elaine Cassel in Eyes of Laura Mars (1978) and Brenda Samuels in True Confessions (1981). She appeared in television movies such as Paradise Lost (1971) and The Death of Richie (1977).

In 1977, Gregorio returned to Broadway after an eight-year hiatus in the original production of Michael Cristofer's The Shadow Box as Agnes; she garnered nominations for the Tony Award for Best Performance by a Featured Actress in a Play and the Drama Desk Award for Outstanding Featured Actress in a Play. Since then her theatre appearances have been sporadic. She appeared as Laurie in the Off-Broadway production of David Blomquist's Weekends Like Other People, at the Marymount Manhattan Theatre in 1982. The following year she returned to Broadway as Beatrice in the original production of A View from the Bridge at the Ambassador Theatre, and again in 1988 as Helga in the original production of M. Butterfly at the Eugene O'Neill Theatre. In 1993, she appeared as Karen Frick in the Manhattan Theatre Club's production of Arthur Miller's The Last Yankee and in 2000 she portrayed the roles of Lena and Sandra in Beth Henley's Family Week at the Century Center for the Performing Arts.

Gregorio remained active in film and television during the 1980s and 1990s. Her film credits include Brenda Samuels in True Confessions (1981), Mrs. Sabantino in Five Corners (1987), Pina in City of Hope (1991), Pina in Tarantella (1995), Grandma Rosie Cappadora in The Deep End of the Ocean (1999), and Helen in Maze (2000). On television, she portrayed Helen Hathaway, the mother of Carol Hathaway, on ER between 1996-99. She made guest appearances on The Doctors (1972), The Bob Newhart Show (1974), Medical Center (1974), The Rookies (1975), Harry O (1975), Jigsaw John (1976), Mary Hartman, Mary Hartman (1976), The Rockford Files (1978), Charlie's Angels (1979), Falcon Crest (1984), Doogie Howser, M.D. (1989), Murder, She Wrote (1991), The Practice (1997) and Law & Order: Criminal Intent (2003), and appeared in numerous television movies.

Personal life
Gregorio was married to Belgian-American stage and film director Ulu Grosbard from 1965 until his death in 2012.

Awards
Gregorio won a Clarence Derwent Award and garnered Tony and Drama Desk Award nominations in 1977 for her portrayal of Agnes in the original production of Michael Cristofer's The Shadow Box.

Filmography

Film

Television

References

External links
 
 
 

1934 births
Actresses from Chicago
American film actresses
American musical theatre actresses
American people of Italian descent
American stage actresses
American television actresses
Clarence Derwent Award winners
Living people
21st-century American women